The Rotterdamsche Kunstkring (RKK) was an association in the Dutch city of Rotterdam, for and by artists and art lovers. Its members included visual artists, architects, writers, recitalists, photographers, musicians and designers.

The Kunstkring settled in Hotel du Passage on Korte Hoogstraat and moved to 35 Witte de Withstraat in 1899. The Kunstkring organized various exhibitions, both group exhibitions on specific themes and solo exhibitions by specific artists. Their debut exhibition was about Jacob and Willem Maris, followed shortly after by an exhibition about Jozef Israëls.

The building on Witte de Withstraat survived the bombing of Rotterdam and would be sold to the municipality of Rotterdam in 1962. During the reconstruction, entrepreneur and art lover Ludo Pieters became closely involved with the Kunstkring. First as a board member (1953) and from 1955 as chairman, he remained this until the association was dissolved in 1969.

References

External links

Buildings and structures in Rotterdam
1893 establishments in the Netherlands
Arts organizations established in 1893
1969 disestablishments in the Netherlands
Arts organizations disestablished in the 20th century